Kim Warwick won the title, defeating Bernard Mitton 7–5, 6–4 in the final.

Seeds

  Gene Mayer (second round)
  John Alexander (semifinals)
  Kim Warwick (champion)
  Tim Wilkison (first round)

Draw

Finals

Top half

Bottom half

External links
 1979 South Australian Open draw

Singles